Sonia Pacheco Irigoyen is a Puerto Rican born in Ponce, PR and resident of San Juan, PR  is a politician affiliated with the Popular Democratic Party (PPD). She was elected to the Puerto Rico House of Representatives in 2012 to represent District 3. She did a Masters in marketing at the University of Phoenix in Puerto Rico. she also earned a master's degree in public relations from the Sacred Heart University of Puerto Rico.

References

External links
Sonia Pacheco Profile on WAPA-TV

Living people
Popular Democratic Party members of the House of Representatives of Puerto Rico
Year of birth missing (living people)